Plum Branch is a stream in Knox and Scotland Counties in the U.S. state of Missouri. It is a tributary of the North Fork Fabius River.

Plum Branch was named for the plum trees near its course.

See also
List of rivers of Missouri

References

Rivers of Knox County, Missouri
Rivers of Scotland County, Missouri
Rivers of Missouri